"Superman Tonight" is a song by American rock band Bon Jovi. It is the second single release from the band's eleventh studio album The Circle. The single was released on January 25, 2010. On December 12, 2009, Bon Jovi performed the song on Saturday Night Live.

Music video
The video premiered on Vevo on Wednesday, February 3, followed by a television premiere on VH1 on Saturday, February 6. It features the band performing in an inflatable tunnel (which resembles the cover for The Circle).  Parts of it show a tribute to everyday "superheroes".

In television
"Superman Tonight" was one of the songs used in the soundtrack of WWE's Tribute to the Troops 2009 show for the ending highlights.
Bon Jovi performed the song live on the American Idol results show on May 12, 2010.
A highlight of "Superman Tonight" was used on USA Network and featured the USA shows such as In Plain Sight, Royal Pains, Psych, White Collar, and Law & Order: Criminal Intent.

Track listing

Charts

Weekly charts

Year-end charts

References

Bon Jovi songs
2010 singles
Songs written by Richie Sambora
Songs written by Jon Bon Jovi
Songs written by Billy Falcon
2009 songs
Song recordings produced by John Shanks